Lawrence Edward Eschen (September 22, 1920 – June 9, 2015) was a Major League Baseball infielder who played in  with the Philadelphia Athletics. He was born in Suffern, New York. He batted and threw right-handed. Eschen had no hits in 11 at-bats, in 12 games, with four walks. His father, Jim, also played in Major League Baseball, with the Cleveland Indians.

See also
List of second-generation Major League Baseball players

External links

Larry Eschen's obituary

1920 births
2015 deaths
Major League Baseball infielders
Baseball players from New York (state)
Philadelphia Athletics players
People from Suffern, New York
Lancaster Red Roses players
Binghamton Triplets players
Utica Braves players
Schenectady Blue Jays players